The 2018 FIBA U18 European Championship Division C was the 14th edition of the Division C of the FIBA U18 European basketball championship. It was played in Pristina, Kosovo, from 22 to 29 July 2018. 9 teams participated in the competition. The host team, Kosovo, won the tournament.

Participating teams

  (24th place, 2017 FIBA U18 European Championship Division B)

First round

Group A

Group B

5th–9th place classification

Championship playoffs

Final standings

References

External links
FIBA official website

FIBA U18 European Championship Division C
2018–19 in European basketball
2018–19 in Kosovan basketball
International youth basketball competitions hosted by Kosovo
Sports competitions in Pristina
July 2018 sports events in Europe